Wuthering Heights is a fictional location in Emily Brontë's 1847 novel of the same name.  A dark and unsightly place, it is the focus of much of the hateful turmoil for which the novel is renowned.  It is most commonly associated with Heathcliff, the novel's primary male protagonist, who, through his devious machinations, eventually comes into ownership both of it and of Thrushcross Grange.  Although the latter is by most accounts a far happier place, Heathcliff chooses to remain in the gloom of the Heights, a home far more amenable to his character.

The first description of Wuthering Heights is provided by Mr Lockwood, a tenant at the Grange and one of the two primary narrators:

Possible inspiration

Many Gothic houses and manors have claimed or had claimed for them the title of Brontë's inspiration in creating the Heights. The best known of these is Top Withens, a ruined farmhouse near Haworth in West Yorkshire which Brontë's biographer Winifred Gérin seems to favour primarily because of its name: the word "Top" suggests "Heights", while "Withens" sounds very much like "Wuthering". An informational sign at the ruines of the house (destroyed by lightning in 1899) acknowledges that the setting is similar, although the building itself bears no resemblance to the house as described in the book.

See also
 Brontë Parsonage Museum, home of the Brontë family

References
Dexter, Gary: "How Wuthering Heights got its name" (The Daily Telegraph, 12 September 2008).
Brontë, Emily: Wuthering Heights (Oxford World's Classics, 1998).

Notes

Fictional buildings and structures originating in literature
Fictional elements introduced in 1847
Fictional houses
Wuthering Heights